73 may refer to: 
 73 (number)
 one of the years 73 BC, AD 73, 1973, 2073
 73 (magazine), a United States-based amateur radio magazine
 73 Best regards, a popular Morse code abbreviation
 No. 73, a British 1980s children's TV show
Nickname for the Boeing 737 airplane
73 Bristol Temple Meads–Bradley Stoke North, a bus route in England

See also
 List of highways numbered